Shakshukowshee Island is a Baffin Island offshore island located in the Arctic Archipelago in Nunavut's Qikiqtaaluk Region. The uninhabited island lies in Cumberland Sound, at the mouth of Robert Peel Inlet. Shakshukuk Island lies along its east side.

References

External links 
 Shakshukowshee Island in the Atlas of Canada - Toporama; Natural Resources Canada

Islands of Baffin Island
Islands of Cumberland Sound
Uninhabited islands of Qikiqtaaluk Region